Satyanarayan Singh (also written as Satya Narain Singh) may refer to: 

 Satyanarayan Singh (U.P. politician) (born 1913), represented the Communist Party of India (Marxist) in the Lok Sabha
 Satyanarayan Singh (Bihar politician, died 1984), general secretary of the Provisional Central Committee, Communist Party of India (Marxist-Leninist)
 Satyanarayan Singh (Bihar politician, died 2020), Bihar State Council Secretary of the Communist Party of India
 Satyanarayan Singh (Bihar politician, Dehri), represents the Bharatiya Janata Party in the Bihar Legislative Assembly